Mutoko North is a constituency of the National Assembly of the Parliament of Zimbabwe, located in Mashonaland East Province. Its current MP since the 2018 election is Mabel Chinomona of ZANU–PF.

References 

Mashonaland East Province
Parliamentary constituencies in Zimbabwe